Friedrich Bauereisen (December 9, 1895 – January 14, 1965) was a German politician of the Christian Social Union in Bavaria (CSU) and former member of the German Bundestag.

Life 
Bauereisen joined the CSU in 1946 after not having been politically active before 1945. From 1948 on, Bauereisen was a member of the district council in the district of Dinkelsbühl. He was a member of the German Bundestag from its first election in 1949 to 1961. Bauereisen represented the Ansbach constituency in parliament.

Literature

References

1895 births
1965 deaths
Members of the Bundestag for Bavaria
Members of the Bundestag 1957–1961
Members of the Bundestag 1953–1957
Members of the Bundestag 1949–1953
Members of the Bundestag for the Christian Social Union in Bavaria